St. Xavier's High School & Junior College, formerly called St. Xavier's High School, is a Catholic school located in the Mumbai Suburban district in Vile Parle West.

The school & Junior College caters to pupils from kindergarten up to class 12 and the medium of instruction is the English language. The school is affiliated to the Maharashtra State Board of Secondary and Higher Secondary Education, Pune, which conducts the annual Board Exams namely the Secondary School Certificate (SSC) examinations and the Higher Secondary School Certificate (HSC) examinations at the close of class 10 and class 12 respectively.

History
It is generally believed that the school started functioning in the early 1890s, some claim it started in 1837 under a banyan tree that fell due to heavy winds and rains on 6 June 2020 inside the educational institution's campus.
Near the level crossing on the western side, St Xaviers church was established in 1868 which saw the commencement of the school. The opening of this school was done by St Vincent de Paul societies Parish Conference.

School life

School flag and shield
The emblem of St. Xavier High School is a shield with a torch in the centre, olive branches on either side and the words "For God and Country" listed on the top of the shield. A banner at the bottom emblazons the motto of the school - "Truth Duty Charity" at the bottom. 
The school flag is the aforementioned emblem in white, on a cobalt blue background.

Motto, school song and school hymn
The Motto of the school is "Truth Duty Charity to God and Country"

House system

The objective of the house system is to foster a sense of collective responsibility and solidarity amongst students. The house system also serves as the centre of school life, with gents from different houses often competing at sports and other co-curricular activities.

There are four school houses, viz. – Blue, Green, Red, Yellow.

School uniform
For the secondary section, the school uniform is as follows, The T-shirt is grey with the school emblem on the pocket denoting the house of the student who wears it, and the pant (from std.5th to std.10th) is dark grey in colour with a belt which also has the emblem on it. Identity card is also a part of the school uniform.

Culture

SXHS is a cosmopolitan school. The school imparts Christian values to the children. The Christmas Concert is celebrated every December and is a three-day event. A sports meet and a farewell party for students who are passing out of the institution are also held annually. Inter-house competitions are held in elocution, drama, debating etc.

Governance

The school employs the prefect system for governance. A different set of prefect are selected for the primary and secondary section.

Student office-bearers - Secondary Section

A Chief-Prefect and a Deputy Chief-Prefect are selected from amongst the students of class 9 by the Principal upon recommendation by the faculty. Additionally, General House Commanders (GHC) and Sports House Commanders (SHC) and Assistant General House Commanders (Asst GHC) one for each house, are also selected. A team of prefects is also selected from the students of class 8. These prefects wear the same uniform, with passants, but the uniform colour is white. Additionally to identify the prefects they are provided with Epaulettes which indicates their position. The Chief-Prefects lose their house and their tie bears colours from all four houses. The ten office bearers wear a sash on special school occasions. A formal investiture ceremony is conducted where the outgoing student office-bearers hand over their charge to the new office-bearers.

Student office-bearers - Primary Section

A team of prefects are selected from amongst the students of class 4 by the Principal upon recommendation by the faculty. The prefects are identified by their white uniforms and their epaulets.

Competitions
English and Hindi Dramatics, Carol Singing, English and Hindi Debates, Arts and Crafts, English, Hindi and Marathi Essay Writing, English Elocution, Monthly Chart Making,
Magic Bus Sports Day, Annual day, School feast and lot more...

Games
All the games are organised and supervised by the teachers as well as the members of the magic bus. The students have a special hour session for games which includes Handball, Football, Kabaddi and many more creative games. The school had won u-16 football tournament in 2017-18 in MSSA.

Activities
Scouting, Sports Day, Guiding and Social Service Each student from Std. VIII to X must take part in one of these activities. The School provides a Library room for the students to get a habit of reading and also to get interest towards increasing their knowledge on the famous writers.
Excursion Leadership Camps are organized from time to time.

References

Primary schools in India
Catholic secondary schools in India
Christian schools in Maharashtra
High schools and secondary schools in Mumbai